This article included the albums and singles released by both Lloyd Cole as a solo artist and the recordings of his band Lloyd Cole and the Commotions, and with his next band Lloyd Cole and the Negatives.

Lloyd Cole and the Commotions discography

Studio albums

Compilation albums

Live albums

Singles

Solo discography

Studio albums

Compilation albums

Live albums

Singles

Lloyd Cole and the Negatives discography

Studio albums

Singles

References 

Lloyd Cole discography